Amastra reticulata was a species of air-breathing land snail, a terrestrial pulmonate gastropod mollusc in the family Amastridae. This species was endemic to Oahu, and was known from the Waianae Range.

References

Amastra
Extinct gastropods
Taxonomy articles created by Polbot